The Cononaco River is a river of Ecuador and Peru.

See also
List of rivers of Ecuador

References
 Rand McNally, The New International Atlas, 1993.
  GEOnet Names Server
 Water Resources Assessment of Ecuador

Rivers of Ecuador
Rivers of Peru
International rivers of South America